Slaughter of the Cock (I sfagi tou kokora) is a 1996 Greek drama film directed by Andreas Pantzis. The film was selected as the Greek entry for the Best Foreign Language Film at the 70th Academy Awards, but was not accepted as a nominee.

Cast
 Georges Corraface as Evagoras
 Dimitris Vellios as Onisilos
 Valeria Golino as Wife
 Popi Avraam
 Gerasimos Skiadaressis
 Imma Piro
 Matthias Habich
 Seymour Cassel

See also
 List of submissions to the 70th Academy Awards for Best Foreign Language Film
 List of Greek submissions for the Academy Award for Best Foreign Language Film

References

External links
 

1996 drama films
1996 films
Greek drama films
1990s Greek-language films